Season 1877–78 was the first in which Hibernian competed at a Scottish national level, entering the Scottish Cup for the first time.

Overview 

Hibs reached the fifth round of the Scottish Cup, losing 3–1 to South Western. They had defeated Edinburgh derby rivals Hearts in the first round after a replay. The fourth round match against Thornliebank was highly unusual. Hibs won the first match 2–1, but the Scottish Football Association decided to consider the result a draw and ordered a replay. After the replay ended in a 2–2 draw, both clubs were admitted to the fifth round of the competition.

Later that season, Hibs and Hearts contested the Final of the Edinburgh FA Cup. Hearts eventually won the local competition after a fourth replay, with the decisive match (won 3–2 by Hearts) played over two months after the first attempt. The long running saga established Hibs and Hearts as the predominant clubs in Edinburgh. The Edinburgh derby, as it would become known, is the second oldest regularly played derby match, after the Nottingham derby between Notts County and Nottingham Forest.

Results 

All results are written with Hibs' score first.

Scottish Cup

See also
List of Hibernian F.C. seasons

References

External links 
 Results For Season 1877/1878 in All Competitions, www.ihibs.co.uk

Hibernian F.C. seasons
Hib